Roekiah (Perfected Spelling: Rukiah; 31 December 1917 – 2 September 1945), often credited as Miss Roekiah, was an Indonesian kroncong singer and film actress. The daughter of two stage performers, she began her career at the age of seven; by 1932 she had become well known in Batavia, Dutch East Indies (now Jakarta, Indonesia),  as a singer and stage actress. Around this time she met Kartolo, whom she married in 1934. The two acted in the 1937 hit film Terang Boelan, in which Roekiah and Rd Mochtar played young lovers.

After the film's commercial success, Roekiah, Kartolo, and most of the cast and crew of Terang Boelan were signed to Tan's Film, first appearing for the company in their 1938 production Fatima. They acted together in two more films before Mochtar left the company in 1940; through these films, Roekiah and Mochtar became the colony's first on-screen couple. Mochtar's replacement, Rd Djoemala, acted with Roekiah in four films, although these were less successful. After the Japanese invaded the Indies in 1942, Roekiah took only one more film role before her death; most of her time was used entertaining Japanese forces.

During her life Roekiah was a fashion and beauty icon, featuring in advertisements and drawing comparisons to Dorothy Lamour and Janet Gaynor. Though most of the films in which she appeared are now lost, she has continued to be cited as a film pioneer, and a 1969 article stated that "in her time [Roekiah] reached a level of popularity which, one could say, has not been seen since". Of her five children with Kartolo, one – Rachmat Kartolo – entered acting.

Biography

Early life
Roekiah was born in Bandoeng (now known as Bandung), Preanger Regencies Residency (now in West Java), Dutch East Indies, in 1917 to Mohammad Ali and Ningsih, actors with the Opera Poesi Indra Bangsawan troupe; Ali was originally from Belitung, while Ningsih was of Sundanese descent and came from Cianjur. Though Roekiah learned acting mainly from her parents, she also studied the craft with other members of their troupe. The trio were constantly travelling, leaving Roekiah with no time for a formal education. By the mid-1920s they were with another troupe, the Opera Rochani.

Roekiah insisted on becoming an actress, despite the opposition of her family, and asked her mother for permission to perform on stage. Ningsih agreed, with one condition: Roekiah could only perform once. When the seven-year-old Roekiah took to the stage for the first time, Mohammad Ali – unaware of the agreement between his wife and daughter – rushed on stage and insisted that Roekiah stop singing. Afterwards, she refused to eat until her parents ultimately relented. Roekiah performed regularly afterwards with the troupe.

By 1932, the year she joined Palestina Opera in Batavia (modern-day Jakarta), Roekiah had become a well-known stage actress and singer of kroncong music (traditional music with Portuguese influences). She was admired not only for her voice, but her beauty. While with Palestina she met Kartolo, an actor, pianist, and songwriter with the troupe; they married later that year. The new couple soon left Palestina, taking month's hiatus before joining the group Faroka on a tour in Singapore. They returned to the Indies in 1936.

Film career

Partnership with Rd Mochtar

In 1937, Roekiah made her first film appearance as the leading lady in Albert Balink's Terang Boelan (Full Moon). She and her co-star Rd Mochtar played two lovers who elope so that Roekiah's character need not marry an opium smuggler; Kartolo also had a small role. The film was a commercial success, earning over 200,000 Straits dollars during its international release; the Indonesian film historian Misbach Yusa Biran credited Roekiah as the "dynamite" which led to this positive reception.

Despite the success of Terang Boelan, its production company Algemeen Nederlandsch Indisch Filmsyndicaat stopped all work on fiction films. Now jobless and depressed after the death of her mother, according to journalist W. Imong, Roekiah "kept silent, constantly musing as if she were mentally disturbed". In order to distract his wife, Kartolo gathered the other cast members from Terang Boelan and established the Terang Boelan Troupe, which toured to Singapore to popular acclaim; this snapped Roekiah out of her melancholy. After the troupe returned to the Indies, most of the cast switched to Tan's Film, including Roekiah and Kartolo; the two also performed with the Lief Java kroncong group.

With Tan's, the Terang Boelan cast appeared in the 1938 hit Fatima, starring Roekiah and Rd Mochtar. The film, in which Roekiah played the title role – a young woman who must fend away the advances of a gang leader while falling in love with a fisherman (Rd Mochtar) – closely followed the formula established by Terang Boelan. Roekiah's acting received wide praise. One reviewer in the Batavia-based Het Nieuws van den dag voor Nederlandsch-Indië wrote that Roekiah's "sober personification of injustice in the Malay adat wedding captivates even the European spectator", while another, in the Bataviaasch Nieuwsblad, found that Roekiah's performance was appreciated by everyone.

Fatima was a massive commercial hit, earning 200,000 gulden on a 7,000 gulden budget. Following the film's success, Tan's continued to cast Roekiah with Rd Mochtar. They became the colony's first on-screen celebrity couple and were termed the Indies' Charles Farrell–Janet Gaynor. The popularity of Roekiah–Rd Mochtar as a screen couple led other studios to follow with their own romantic pairings. The Teng Chun's Java Industrial Film, for instance, paired Mohamad Mochtar and Hadidjah in Alang-Alang (Grass, 1939).

In order to keep their new star, Tan's Film spent a large amount of money. Roekiah and Kartolo received a monthly holding fee of 150 gulden and 50 gulden respectively, twice as much as they had been given for Terang Boelan. They were also given a house in Tanah Rendah, Batavia. Roekiah and Kartolo, for their part, continued to act for the company; Kartolo often had small, comedic, roles, and Roekiah sang songs her husband had written. In 1939, they appeared together, again with Rd Mochtar as Roekiah's romantic foil, in the Zorro-influenced Gagak Item. Though not as successful as Roekiah's previous works, the film was still profitable. A reviewer for the Bataviaasch Nieuwsblad praised Roekiah's "demure" acting.

Roekiah's last film with Rd Mochtar, Siti Akbari, was released in 1940. Possibly inspired by a poem of the same name by Lie Kim Hok, the film featured Roekiah in the title role, portraying a long-suffering wife who remains faithful to her husband despite his infidelity. The film was well-received, earning 1,000 gulden on its first night in Surabaya, but was ultimately unable to return profits similar to Terang Boelan or Fatima.

Partnership with Djoemala

Amidst a wage dispute, Rd Mochtar left Tan's for their competitor Populair Films in 1940. Accordingly, the company began looking for a new on-screen partner for Roekiah. Kartolo asked an acquaintance, a tailor-cum-entrepreneur named Ismail Djoemala to take the part; though Djoemala had never acted before, he had sung with the group Malay Pemoeda in 1929. After Kartolo asked him six times to act for Tan's, Djoemala agreed. The company found  the tall and good-looking Djoemala a suitable replacement, and hired him, giving him the stage name Rd Djoemala.

Roekiah and Djoemala made their first film together, Sorga Ka Toedjoe (Seventh Heaven), later that year. In the film, Roekiah played a young woman who, with the help of her lover, is able to reunite her blind aunt (Annie Landouw) with her estranged husband (Kartolo). This film was a commercial success, and the reviews were positive. One, for the Soerabaijasch Handelsblad, opined that Djoemala was as good as, if not better, than Rd Mochtar. Another review, for the Singapore Free Press, wrote that "Roekiah fills the part of the heroine in a most praiseworthy manner". In April of the following year Tan's released Roekihati, starring Roekiah as a young woman who goes to the city to earn money for her ailing family, ultimately marrying. Her performance received praise from the Bataviaasch Nieuwsblad, which wrote that she had performed well in the difficult role.

Later in 1941 Roekiah and Djoemala completed Poesaka Terpendam (Buried Treasure), an action-filled film which followed two groups – the rightful heirs (Roekiah being one of them) and a band of criminals – in a race to find treasure buried in Banten. Roekiah and Djoemala worked on their final film together, Koeda Sembrani (The Enchanted Horse), in early 1942. In the film, adapted from One Thousand and One Nights, Roekiah took the role of Princess Shams-al-Nahar and was shown flying on a horse. The film was still incomplete when the Japanese occupation of the Dutch East Indies began in March 1942, though it was screened by October 1943.

Altogether Roekiah and Djoemala acted in four films in two years. Biran argues this is evidence the company "wasted their treasure", as its competitors used their stars more often; Java Industrial Film, for instance, completed six films starring Moh. Mochtar in 1941 alone. Though Roekiah's films continued to be financial successes, they did not earn as large a profit as her earlier works.

Japanese occupation and death
Film production in the Indies declined after the Japanese occupation began in early 1942; the overlords forced all but one studio to close. In their place, the Japanese opened their own studio in the Indies, Nippon Eigasha, to produce propaganda for the war effort. Kartolo acted in the studio's only feature film, Berdjoang (Hope of the South), without Roekiah in 1943. After a hiatus of several years, Roekiah also acted for the studio, taking a role in the short Japanese propaganda film Ke Seberang (To the Other Side) in 1944. However, much of her time was spent touring Java with a theatrical company, entertaining Japanese troops.

Roekiah fell ill in February 1945, not long after completing Ke Seberang. Despite this, and a miscarriage, she was unable to go on break; the Japanese forces insisted that she and Kartolo go on tour to Surabaya, in eastern Java. Upon her return to Jakarta, her condition became worse. After several months of treatment, she died on 2 September 1945, mere weeks after Indonesia proclaimed its independence. The date she died was also the day of Japan's surrender which formally ended World War II and the occupation. Roekiah was buried in Kober Hulu, Jatinegara, Djakarta.  Her funeral was attended by the Minister of Education Ki Hajar Dewantara.

Family

Roekiah said that she felt Kartolo was a good match with her, stating that the marriage brought them "great fortune". The two had had five children. After Roekiah's death, Kartolo brought the children to his hometown at Yogyakarta. In order to support the family, he took a job with Radio Republik Indonesia, beginning in 1946. There he spent most of the ongoing Indonesian National Revolution, an armed conflict and diplomatic struggle between newly proclaimed Indonesia and the Dutch Empire in which the newly proclaimed country attempted to receive international recognition of its independence. After the Dutch military launched Operation Kraai on 19 December 1948, capturing Yogyakarta, Kartolo refused to collaborate with the returning colonial forces. Without a source of income, he fell ill, and died on 18 January 1949.

One of the couple's children died in Yogyakarta, aged ten. The remaining children were brought to Jakarta after the Indonesian National Revolution ended in 1950, where they were raised by Kartolo's close friend Adikarso. One, Rachmat Kartolo, went on to be a singer and actor active up through the 1970s, known for songs such as "Patah Hati" ("Heartbroken") and films such as Matjan Kemajoran (Tiger of Kemayoran; 1965) and Bernafas dalam Lumpur (Breathing in the Mud; 1970). Two other sons, Jusuf and Imam, played in a band with their brother before finding careers elsewhere. The couple's daughter, Sri Wahjuni, did not enter the entertainment industry.

Legacy
The press viewed Roekiah fondly, and her new releases consistently received positive reviews. At the peak of Roekiah's popularity, fans based their fashion decisions on what Roekiah wore on-screen. Roekiah appeared regularly in advertisements, and numerous records with her vocal performances were available on the market. One fan, in a 1996 interview, recalled that Roekiah was "every man's idol", while others christened Roekiah as Indonesia's Dorothy Lamour. Another fan, recalling a performance he had witnessed over fifty years earlier, stated:

{{Quote|text=Roekiah always left her audiences riveted to their seats when she began crooning her kroncong songs. She always got applause, before or after singing. Not only from the native [Indonesians]. Many Dutchmen diligently watched her performances! In 1977 Keluarga magazine styled her one of Indonesia's "pioneering film stars", writing that hers was "a natural talent, a combination of her personality and the tenderness and beauty of her face, always filled with romance".

Filmography

Terang Boelan (Full Moon; 1937)
Fatima (1938)
Gagak Item (Black Raven; 1939)
Siti Akbari (1940)
Sorga Ka Toedjoe (Seventh Heaven; 1940)
Roekihati (1940)
Poesaka Terpendam (Buried Treasure; 1941)
Koeda Sembrani (The Enchanted Horse; 1942)
Ke Seberang (To the Other Side; 1944; short film)

Explanatory notes

References

Works cited

 
 (book acquired from the collection of Museum Tamansiswa Dewantara Kirti Griya, Yogyakarta)

External links

1917 births
1945 deaths
20th-century Indonesian actresses
20th-century Indonesian women singers
Actresses of the Dutch East Indies
Indonesian child actresses
Indonesian collaborators with Imperial Japan
Indonesian film actresses
Indonesian people of Malay descent
Indonesian stage actresses
Malay people
People from Bandung
Sundanese people